Jim McGorman (born c. 1974), a native of Philadelphia, is an American musician, songwriter/producer and multi-instrumentalist: guitarist, keyboardist, vocalist and drummer. McGorman is best known for his work with the House Band on the CBS television shows Rockstar: INXS and Rockstar: Supernova. He has also performed with and produced American alternative rock band Goo Goo Dolls.

Early life
McGorman grew up in Cherry Hill, New Jersey and graduated Cherry Hill High School East, 1992; graduated Berklee College of Music in 1995 with a degree in audio engineering and music production.

Career
He has been musical director for Avril Lavigne, Weezer, Michelle Branch, Paul Stanley (from KISS) and toured with Cher. With Cher on her Farewell Tour, McGorman played guitars, keyboards and sang a duet with Cher. He has also worked with Gwen Stefani, Shakira, The Corrs, Aaron Neville, New Radicals, Poison, Goo Goo Dolls and Marc Broussard.  He has written songs for Kate Voegele, Bret Michaels (Poison), Marc Broussard and for TV shows such as One Tree Hill and Smallville.  TV performances include Saturday Night Live, The Tonight Show, BBC's Top of the Pops, "American Music Awards", "Vancouver 2010 Olympics Closing Ceremonies", Conan O'Brien, Regis and Kelly, The View,  and MTV's TRL.   Jim performed with Michelle Branch on the TV series Buffy the Vampire Slayer (episode: Tabula Rasa) and with Dilana Robichaux (the runner-up from Rock Star: Supernova) on The Ellen DeGeneres Show.  In October/November 2006, Jim and the House Band toured the United States with Paul Stanley (from KISS).   In January 2007, Jim became a member of Avril Lavigne's band and toured with her from 2007 to 2013. Currently, he is touring with Goo Goo Dolls.

Regarding the Rockstar TV show house band, he says that he feels his role is a multifaceted one: guitar, keys and singing. "Plus, being a writer/artist myself, I feel that I understand how to work with the singers. From a guitar perspective, I try to capture the original tones of the records we play, from guitars to tunings and effects. Rafa has a unique tone that he really likes, so the more I get the original tones right, the more I think the audience will relate to the performance."

Musical Influences
"Everyone in my family is musical or some sort of performer. My mother was a dancer, and my dad plays piano and sings. My dad, though, really got me going with music. He showed me the beauty of chord changes. Mom was more of a "word writer." I got my love of lyrics from her. I guess you could say I'm very fortunate to have talented and supportive parents. - Started playing piano at six, drums at eight, guitar at 12, and I've been singing since I was born." 

McGorman cites a number of popular music influences, including soul music of Gamble and Huff, and the rock of Coldplay and U2.

Discography

References

External links
 Jim McGorman Official Web site
 Jim McGorman (MySpace) Web Site
 Jim McGorman on ROCKBANDLOUNGE.COM
 Jim McGorman - On The Rebound

American rock guitarists
American male guitarists
Berklee College of Music alumni
Living people
1970s births
Singers from Pennsylvania
Guitarists from New Jersey
Guitarists from Philadelphia
People from Cherry Hill, New Jersey
Cherry Hill High School East alumni
21st-century American singers
21st-century American guitarists
21st-century American keyboardists
21st-century American male singers